Spiniluma is a genus of flowering plant in the family Sapotaceae. The genus is native to Eritrea, Ethiopia, Saudi Arabia, and Socotra.

Species
, Plants of the World Online accepted two species:
Spiniluma discolor (Radcl.-Sm.) Friis
Spiniluma oxyacantha (Baill.) Aubrév.

References

Chrysophylloideae
Sapotaceae genera
Taxa named by André Aubréville
Taxa named by Henri Ernest Baillon